Canberra Illustrated: A Quarterly Magazine was a magazine published once on 1 November 1925 in Canberra, Australian Capital Territory.

History
The Canberra Illustrated: A Quarterly Magazine was intended as a quarterly magazine published in Canberra, Australian Capital Territory. Its only issue was the Xmas issue published in November 1925.  The paper was subtitled The Federal Capital in Picture, Verse and Story.  It was edited by D. Bernard O'Connor and Robert Jones and printed by New Century Press Ltd.

Digitisation
The paper has been digitised as part of the Australian Newspapers Digitisation Program of the National Library of Australia.

References

External links
 

1925 establishments in Australia
1925 disestablishments in Australia
Defunct magazines published in Australia
Magazines established in 1925
Magazines disestablished in 1925
Mass media in Canberra
Quarterly magazines published in Australia